Guanwen (1798 – 1871), courtesy name Xiufeng, was a Manchu official, Grand Secretariat, military general, Viceroy of Zhili, Huguan and commander of the Army Group Central Plain during the late Qing Dynasty in China.

Guanwen was born in a Manchu clan Wanggiya. He raised the Green Standard Army to fight effectively against the Taiping Rebellion and restored the stability of Qing Dynasty along with other prominent figures, including Zuo Zongtang and Li Hongzhang, setting the scene for the era later known as the "Tongzhi Restoration". He was known for his strategic perception and administrative skill.

Oversight of the Xiang Army
Guanwen was appointed Viceroy of Huguang from 1856 when the civil war. This was after two previous holders of the post had been killed in battle and another had committed suicide.  Guanwen led the 600,000-strong Green Standard Army in the Central Plain.

References
Draft History of Qing

1798 births
1891 deaths
Manchu politicians
Qing dynasty generals
Qing dynasty politicians from Heilongjiang
Political office-holders in Hubei
Political office-holders in Tianjin
Generals from Heilongjiang
Grand Secretaries of the Qing dynasty
Assistant Grand Secretaries
Viceroys of Huguang
Viceroys of Zhili
Members of the Green Standard Army